ZNP-FM is a soft rock/easy listening radio station in Nassau, Bahamas.  In addition to music, the station airs news, weather reports, town hall meetings, conventions and other community radio programs.

External links 
 

Radio stations in the Bahamas
Classical music radio stations
Radio stations established in 2012